The Nilson Nelson Gymnasium (Ginásio Nilson Nelson) is an indoor sporting arena used mostly for volleyball located in Brasília, Brazil, which is near the Estádio Nacional Mané Garrincha. Both are part of the Ayrton Senna Sports Complex. The capacity of the arena is 11,105 spectators and it was built in 1973.

The hall was designed by Cláudio Cianciarullo and opened on April 21, 1973. From 1973 to 2008, the arena had a capacity of 24,286 seats. In 2008, the multi-purpose arena was renovated and reduced the spectator capacity to 11,105 seats. It is used mainly for indoor sports, and was the secondary venue at  2008 FIFA Futsal World Cup.

Concerts and events 
A-ha – 2010 (5,500)
Black Eyed Peas – 2006 (14,000)
Bob Dylan – 2012
Eric Clapton – 1990 (24,000)
The Cranberries – 2010 (10,000)
Deep Purple – 1997
Green Day – 2010 (9,500)
David Guetta – 2010
Duran Duran – 2012
Guns N' Roses – 2014 (11,000)
Jackson 5 – 1974
Avril Lavigne – 2011 (16,600)
McFly – 2009 (8,000)
Megadeth – 2010  (13,000)
Alanis Morissette – 2009
Motörhead – 2010 (5,500)
Ozzy Osbourne– 2010 (8,000)
Paramore – 2011  (11,000)
Scorpions – 2010 (11,532)
RBD – 2007 (14,000)
RBD – 2008 (15,000)
Rihanna – 2011   (13,500)
Roxette – 2012
Sade – 2011
Seal – 2011 (3,500)
Shakira – 1996 (21,000), 2011 (16,000)
UFC Fight Night: Silva vs. Arlovski (UFC Fight Night 51) – September 13, 2014 (8,822)
Iron Maiden, The Book of Souls World Tour – 22 March 2016 (13,500)

American superstar Miley Cyrus was scheduled to perform in the Gymnasium on September 24, 2014 as part of her highly anticipated, Bangerz World Tour but was cancelled due to logistical issues.

See also
List of indoor arenas in Brazil

References

External links

Arena information

Indoor arenas in Brazil
Sports venues completed in 1973
Event venues established in 1973
Sports venues in Brasília
Volleyball venues in Brazil
Basketball venues in Brazil